The national parks of Quebec are protected areas created by the provincial government of Quebec in order to protect territories representative of natural regions of the province or sites of exceptional character while making them accessible to the public for educational purposes or extensive recreation. Most of them are administered by the Société des établissements de plein air du Québec (Sépaq) with the exception of four parks administered by Nunavik Parks, and one park jointly administered by Parks Canada and Sépaq.

History 

The first national park in Quebec was created on 12 January, 1895. This is Parc de la Montagne-Tremblante, which is the third provincial park after Algonquin Park, which was created two years earlier.

In order to reinforce the protection in its parks and to respect the criteria of the International Union for Conservation of Nature for protected areas, the government legislated in 1977 with the Parks Act. This divided the parks into two categories: conservation parks, favouring the protection of the natural territory, and recreation parks, which allowed the installation of intensive recreation equipment.

It was from 1999 that the Société des établissements de plein air du Québec (Sépaq) was given the mandate to manage all the parks in Quebec. In 2001, the government changed the status of recreation and conservation parks to one status, that of national parks. The purpose of this change was to strengthen the conservation component of parks.

Area 
The size of Quebec's national parks varies depending on whether they are located in southern Quebec, which is densely populated, or in northern Quebec, which is very sparsely populated. Thus, the parks located in southern Quebec are generally small.

 0 at : 11 parks
 100 at : 8 parks
 500 at : 3 parks
 1000 at : 3 parks
  and more: 1 park

Zoning 
To meet the conservation objective, a zoning system has been put in place. One of the functions of zoning is to distinguish areas of great fragility and those with good support capacity. The zonings are:
 Reception and service area
 Ambience zone
 Preservation area
 Extreme preservation area
The 'welcome and service area' is, as the name suggests, usually where visitors enter the park. Restrictions on development are less severe than in other areas. This is why there is reception, campsites with services, play areas, sanitary blocks.

The “ambience zone” is the region of a park where it is possible to practice sports which allow the discovery of nature while having a low impact on the environment, such as hiking or snowshoeing. Generally, the facilities are smaller than in the service area.

The 'preservation zone' has a limited support and regeneration capacity and often shelters particular, rare or fragile plant and animal species. The use of the territory is reduced and strongly supervised. Apart from a belvedere, the amenities are non-existent.

The preservation zone extreme is prohibited to all traffic and development. To get there, you must have an authorization from the park director and have a scientific purpose. There are often rare species there that are sensitive to disturbance.

The protection of certain fragile or exceptional ecosystems is done through strict regulations. Logging, mining, petroleum and energy exploitation as well as hunting and trapping are strictly prohibited. On the other hand, the practice of outdoor sports such as mountain walking, snowshoeing, canoeing or biking are accepted and fall within the mandate of discovering the parks. Several other natural environment interpretation activities are offered and the many naturalist guides present are there to answer your questions. Since 1999, the management of the activities and services of these environments has been entrusted to the Société des établissements de plein air du Québec (SÉPAQ). In addition, the parks north of the 55th parallel are managed by the Kativik Regional Government.

In 2001, Quebec's parks became national parks. The designation 'national' indicates that the parks comply with standards established by the International Union for Conservation of Nature  (IUCN). According to IUCN, a national park is a protected area managed primarily for the protection of ecosystem and for recreational purposes.

List of national parks in Quebec

National park reserve 
In addition to national parks, the ministry has also designated areas as national park reserves. These territories, although they are protected areas, do not have the same legal protection as that of the parks. These territories are exclusively in Nunavik, the department prefers the status of biodiversity reserve for the other regions of Quebec.

National park projects 
Research will be carried out with a view to acquiring knowledge concerning two other projects in Nunavik, namely:
 from Cape Wolstenholme,
 from Baie-aux-Feuilles.

The creation of two parks is also being considered in boreal forest, in partnership with the Cree. These are national park projects:
 Nibiischii (formerly titled Albanel-Témiscamie-Otish),
 Assinica.

The Ministère de l'Environnement et de la Lutte contre les changements climatiques (Ministry of Sustainable Development, Environment and Parks of Quebec) has also undertaken preliminary studies concerning other national park projects:
 Harrington-Harbour,
 Natashquan-Aguanus-Kenamu.

Public consultations were also held for the expansion of Mont-Orford National Park and Pointe-Taillon National Park.

See also 
 Protected areas of Quebec
 List of protected areas of Quebec
 Zone d'exploitation contrôlée (Controlled Harvesting Zone) (ZEC)

Notes and references

Further reading

External links 
 Official site of Parcs Québec, affiliated with SEPAQ
 
  (Manager of the Pingualuit, Kuururjuaq and Tursujuq national parks)

National parks of Quebec
Quebec
Tourism in Quebec
Parks in Canada